Dodda Chikkana Halli  is a village in the southern state of Karnataka, India. It is located in the Nagamangala taluk of Mandya district in Karnataka.

Villages in Mandya district